Rainbow Over the Range is a 1940 American Western film directed by Albert Herman and written by Robert Emmett Tansey and Roger Merton. The film stars Tex Ritter, Slim Andrews, Dorothy Fay, Gene Alsace, Warner Richmond and James Pierce. The film was released on July 29, 1940, by Monogram Pictures.

Plot 
A gang of horse thieves have killed the sheriff and his deputy and have stolen all the horses that Jeff Manners needs to fulfill his contract with the U. S. Cavalry, then U.S. Marshal Tex Reed and his pal, Slim Chance, arrive in town. Tex then beats gang member Bart Griffin in a fight, Rader and Griffin decide to get Tex out of the way. They frame Jeff, but he joins forces with Tex in time to stop another horse raid in which Slim is injured.

Cast          
Tex Ritter as Tex Reed
Slim Andrews as Slim Chance 
Dorothy Fay as Mary Manners
Gene Alsace as Bart 
Warner Richmond as Gene Griffin
James Pierce as Jim Rader 
Chuck Morrison as Buck Reding
Dennis Moore as Jeff Manners
Charles Wilcox as Musician
Ted Bronson as Musician
Garland Edmundson as Musician
Zoebra McLain Jackson as Singer 
Pinkie Jackson as Musician

References

External links
 

1940 films
American Western (genre) films
1940 Western (genre) films
Monogram Pictures films
Films directed by Albert Herman
American black-and-white films
1940s English-language films
1940s American films